James Harding may refer to:

 J. Barclay Harding (1830–1865), publisher of the Philadelphia Evening Telegraph
 James Harding (cricketer), English professional cricketer
 James Harding (explorer) (1838–1864), English explorer
 James Harding (harbourmaster) (1811–1867)
 James Harding (journalist) (born 1969), British journalist and former Director of BBC News
 James A. Harding (1848–1922), early influential leader in the Church of Christ
 James Duffield Harding (1798–1863), English landscape painter
 James McKay Harding (1926–1995), political figure in Nova Scotia, Canada
 James Harding (music writer) (1929–2007), writer on music and theatre
 James Havelock Harding (1883–1978), master shipwright and shipbuilder
 James C. Harding (born 1934), United States Air Force officer
 Nick Zedd (né James Franklyn Harding III, 1956–2022)

See also
 Jamie Harding (born 1979), English actor
 Jaime Harding (born 1975), singer with British band Marion
 Jim Harding, author of Canada's Deadly Secret: Saskatchewan Uranium and the Global Nuclear System
 James Hardin (disambiguation)